The 609th Air Operations Center (609 AOC) is an active unit of the United States Air Force based at Al Udeid Air Base, Qatar. The unit is responsible for the daily execution of the air tasking order (ATO) on behalf of the Combined Forces Air Component Commander (CFACC) in the United States Central Command area of responsibility. The unit's personnel work with partners from 18 other nations to complete their mission.

Lineage
 Established as the 609th Air Operations Group and activated on 1 January 1994
 Redesignated 609th Air and Space Operations Center on 1 March 2008
 Redesignated 609th Air Operations Center on 1 December 2014

Assignments
 Ninth Air Force (later, Ninth Air Force (Air Forces Central), United States Air Forces Central Command, Ninth Air Force (Air Forces Central)), 1 January 1994 – present

Components
 609th Air Support Squadron: 17 September 2019 – present

Stations
 Shaw Air Force Base, South Carolina, 1 January 1994
 Al Udeid Air Base, Qatar, 1 March 2008 – present

References

Air Operations Centers of the United States Air Force